Henry Miles Fitzalan-Howard, Earl of Arundel (born 3 December 1987), also known as Henry Arundel, is a British aristocrat, businessman and former racing driver. He is the heir apparent to the Dukedom of Norfolk, and the family seat is Arundel Castle. He was called Lord Maltravers from birth until his father succeeded to the dukedom in 2002, at which point he became known by the courtesy title of Earl of Arundel.

Life and career
Lord Arundel is the eldest son of Edward Fitzalan-Howard, 18th Duke of Norfolk, and his ex-wife Georgina Gore. From 2007 to 2010, he studied at the University of Bristol and graduated with an Honours Bachelor of Science degree in economics.

Between 2010 and 2019, he worked in various private equity and corporate finance roles in London at NM Rothschild, Evercore Partners and then Inflexion Private Equity. In 2019, he co-founded Noble Insurance Group, where he serves as a managing director.

Lord Arundel's other interests include skiing, hiking and climbing.

Racing driver
In 2006, under the name Henry Arundel, he competed in the Formula BMW UK Championship, driving for Fortec Motorsport and winning the Rookie Cup. He was elected to the Motor Sports Association Race Elite Scheme in April 2007, along with five other drivers in various British series. He remained with the Fortec Motorsport team during the 2007 Formula BMW UK season and placed third overall.

In 2008, he raced for Räikkönen Robertson Racing in the British Formula 3 Championship. He scored 21 points and finished 15th in the standings. He raced for Carlin Motorsport during the 2009 British Formula 3 season. He scored 90 points and finished 9th in the standings.

Marriage and family
He married Cecilia Mary Elizabeth dei Conti (of the Counts) Colacicchi, Nobile di Anagni (born 1988) at Arundel Cathedral on 16 July 2016. They have two daughters, Lady Flora Mary Isabella Fitzalan-Howard (born 10 November 2018) and Lady Eliza Rachel Marie Fitzalan-Howard (born 12 May 2020).

Cecilia is the daughter of Count William Colacicchi, descendant of Odoardo Colacicchi and of Clare Elizabeth Vivienne Clutterbuck.

References

1987 births
English racing drivers
Pages of Honour
Living people
Henry Fitzalan-Howard, Earl of Arundel
Henry Fitzalan-Howard, Earl of Arunde
Courtesy earls
British Formula Three Championship drivers
Formula BMW UK drivers
Carlin racing drivers
Alumni of the University of Bristol
Double R Racing drivers
Fortec Motorsport drivers